The Warrior is a bootleg version of the album Ojah Awake (1976) by British Afro rock band Osibisa, released without authorisation in 1992 by Soundwings Records MC-102.1075-2 and distributed by Serenade S.A., Barcelona, Spain.  The CD duplicates the Ojah Awake album (in poorer fidelity) with the addition of a track dubbed from Osibisa's video.

Track listing

Sources
Tracks 1-9 from Ojah Awake (1976)
Track 10 from live concert video (Marquee Club, 1983)

Personnel
Release includes no musician credits

References
All information gathered from back CD cover The Warrior (Copyright © 1992 Soundwings Records MC-102.1077-2).
audio-music.info

1992 compilation albums
Osibisa albums